Flexible working may refer to:
Flextime or flexitime
The United Kingdom's Flexible Working Regulations 2014
The United Kingdom's Armed Forces (Flexible Working) Act 2018